Ranquitte is a commune in the Saint-Raphaël Arrondissement, in the Nord department of Haiti. It has 18,197 inhabitants.

The school in Ranquitte is the Spady-Calhoun school named partly in honor of one of its benefactors, Dr. Steven Spady of Hindman, KY.  There is also a Health Clinic on campus there. Both the school and clinic are overseen by a Haitian staff and maintained by Christian Flights International , a non-profit missionary organization that has been sending trips into this area for over 40 years.

References

Populated places in Nord (Haitian department)
Communes of Haiti